McAra is a surname. Notable people with the surname include: 

 James McAra (1876–1947), Scottish-Canadian and political figure
Lesley McAra, Scottish legal scholar
 Peter McAra Jr. (1862–1949), Scottish-Canadian and political figure
 Tracie McAra (born 1960), Canadian basketball player
 Irene McAra-McWilliam, British design researcher and academic
Judith McAra-Couper, New Zealand midwifery academic

See also
 John McAra House, historic house in Davison, Michigan